The 2019 BDO World Professional Darts Championship was the 42nd World Championship organised by the British Darts Organisation, and the 34th and final staging at the Lakeside Country Club at Frimley Green.

Glen Durrant was the two-time defending men's champion after beating Mark McGeeney, 7–6 in the previous year's final.

Durrant successfully defended his title to become the first three times consecutive BDO Men's World Champion since Eric Bristow in 1986, and the first male player in history to win his first three world championship finals.

Lisa Ashton was the two-time defending women's champion, after winning her fourth world title, with a 3–1 win over Anastasia Dobromyslova in 2018, but was defeated in the first round by Mikuru Suzuki.

Suzuki went on to become the fifth BDO Women's World Champion, after defeating Lorraine Winstanley 3–0 in the final. In doing so, she hit the highest ever average in a Women’s World Championship Final.

Three-time champion Martin Adams missed out on the event for the first time since his debut appearance in 1994.

Prize money 
Men's

Women's

Men's

Format and qualifiers

1–16 in BDO rankingsSeeded in first round
  Mark McGeeney (second round)
  Glen Durrant (champion)
  Jim Williams (semi-finals)
  Wesley Harms (second round)
  Michael Unterbuchner (semi-finals)
  Scott Mitchell (quarter-finals)
  Gary Robson (first round)
  Richard Veenstra (second round)
  Scott Waites (runner-up)
  Chris Landman (first round)
  Dave Parletti (first round)
  Wayne Warren (second round)
  Willem Mandigers (quarter-finals)
  Daniel Day (first round)
  Ross Montgomery (first round)
  Martin Phillips (first round)

17–24 in BDO rankings First round

25–27 in BDO rankings Preliminary round

Winmau World MasterPreliminary round

Regional Table qualifiers Preliminary round
  Brian Løkken (preliminary round)
  Paul Hogan (first round)
  David Cameron (second round)
  Oliver Ferenc (first round)
  Mark McGrath (first round)
  Jim Widmayer (preliminary round)
  Roger Janssen (first round)
  Mal Cuming (preliminary round)

Playoff qualifiers Preliminary round
  Krzysztof Kciuk (second round)
  Nigel Heydon (first round)
  Ryan Hogarth (preliminary round)
  Andy Hamilton (preliminary round)

Draw bracket 
The draw was conducted on 22 November 2018.

Preliminary round 
All matches are the first to 3 sets.

Last 32

Women's

Format and qualifiers

1–8 in BDO rankings Seeded
  Lorraine Winstanley (runner-up)
  Lisa Ashton (first round)
  Deta Hedman (first round)
  Anastasia Dobromyslova (semi-finals)
  Aileen de Graaf (quarter-finals)
  Fallon Sherrock (quarter-finals)
  Sharon Prins (quarter-finals)
  Trina Gulliver (quarter-finals)

9–14 in BDO rankings First round

Playoff qualifiersFirst round
  Karolina Podgórska (first round)
  Mikuru Suzuki (winner)

Draw
The draw was conducted on 22 November 2018.

Youth

TV coverage
Eurosport and Quest began a three-year deal to cover the event.

References

2019
2019 in darts
2019 in English sport
Sport in Surrey
Frimley Green
BDO World Darts